Sticta hallii is a species of fungus belonging to the family Peltigeraceae.

Synonym:
 Lobaria hallii

References

Peltigerales